Peter Boyd (born 1950) is a world champion American bridge player. He has won one world championship, finished second in another, and won 17 North American bridge championships.

Boyd was born in Washington, DC and still lives there. He graduated from Harvard. He is a retired computer programmer.

Bridge accomplishments

Awards

 Mott-Smith Trophy (1) 1987

Wins

 Rosenblum Cup (1) 1986 
 North American Bridge Championships (17)
 Lebhar IMP Pairs (1) 2001 
 North American Pairs (3) 1985, 2016, 2017 
 Grand National Teams (3) 1984, 1988, 1992 
 Jacoby Open Swiss Teams (2) 1986, 2012 
 Vanderbilt (3) 1987, 1991, 1997 
 Senior Knockout Teams (1) 2012 
 Keohane North American Swiss Teams (1) 2013 
 Mitchell Board-a-Match Teams (2) 1989, 1994 
 Reisinger (1) 1986

Runners-up

 d'Orsi Senior Bowl (1) 2011 
 North American Bridge Championships
 von Zedtwitz Life Master Pairs (1) 1987 
 Lebhar IMP Pairs (1) 2004 
 Blue Ribbon Pairs (1) 1982 
 Nail Life Master Open Pairs (1) 1988 
 Grand National Teams (2) 1985, 2011 
 Vanderbilt (2) 1992, 1999 
 Spingold (1) 1992

Notes

External links
 

1950 births
Living people
American contract bridge players
People from Washington, D.C.
Harvard University alumni
Date of birth missing (living people)